Talash or Talaash may refer to:
 Talash (book), a book by Mumtaz Mufti
 Talaash (album), a 1993 album by Junoon, a Pakistani pop music group
 "Talaash" (song)
Talaash (Indian TV series)
Talaash (Pakistani TV series), a Pakistani television mini-series featuring Junoon
 Talaash (1957 film), a Hindi film by Vishram Bedekar
 Talash (1969 film), a Hindi film by O. P. Ralhan
 Talaash: The Hunt Begins..., a Hindi film by Suneel Darshan
 Talaash (2012 film), a Hindi film by Reema Kagti
Talaash Air Defense System, an Iranian anti-aircraft missile launcher
 Talash (UAV), an Iranian drone

See also
Talas (disambiguation)